Season 1976–1977 was the 104th season of competitive football in Scotland and the 80th season of Scottish league football.

After the failure of the Spring Cup and the 26-game season in the First and Second Divisions, a 39-game season was instituted in these divisions with a slight imbalance in the number of home and away games played by each team; however, this was seen as preferable to a lengthy 52-game season.

Scottish Premier Division

Champions: Celtic 
Relegated: Hearts, Kilmarnock

Scottish League First Division

Promoted: St. Mirren, Clydebank 
Relegated: Raith Rovers, Falkirk

Scottish League Second Division

Promoted: Stirling Albion, Alloa Athletic

Cup honours

Other honours

National

County

 - aggregate over two legs - play off - won on penalties

Highland League

Individual honours

Scotland national team

1977 British Home Championship - Winners

Key:
(H) = Home match
(A) = Away match
WCQG7 = World Cup qualifying - Group 7
BHC = British Home Championship

Notes and references

External links
Scottish Football Historical Archive

 
Seasons in Scottish football